is a Japanese professional drifting driver, currently serve as judge in Formula Drift Japan after stop competing in 2019.

He has always enjoyed driving, so drifting was a natural thing for him. His other passion is flowers as his parents ran a florist business and he has always helped them out. So he has always known that he would be a florist, when he is not drifting he is working in a florists in Yamanashi called Silky House. His favourite time of the week is when he and his wife drive out to collect stock, Sometimes he cannot make it as he is at a photo shoot or a D1 event, so he uses the internet to check up.

He has been competing in the D1 Grand Prix series since it began in October 2000. His first successful year was the  season where he won the series title in his A'PEXi Mazda RX-7 (FD3S). After A'PEXi left the series he switched to ORC and has been working with the team to improve the performance of the Nissan Fairlady Z coming in sixth in the  series. In 2008, he switched to the newly formed team Auto Produce Boss with Potenza D-1 Project, driving their Nissan Silvia S15 which was actually Yasuyuki Kazama's 2005 Championship car. He went on to win the 2009, 2010 and 2011 Series Championship in this car, making him the only driver with the most championship titles at four, the first driver to win titles in consecutive years, the second driver with the most wins at 16 after Daigo Saito. He remained compete in D1 driving for Nichiei Racing, OTG Motorsports and MMM Racing, he stopped competing after 2019 season and now became one of the judge for Formula Drift Japan

Like rival drifter who he was team mate to, Ryuji Miki, he also competed in the Net'z Cup, a one make series for the Toyota Altezza between 2005 and its final season in 2006, his racing antics were documented twice on Video Option.

Complete drifting results

D1 Grand Prix

Sources
JDM Option
D1 Grand Prix
Silky House Flower Boutique
Home page
Auto Produce Boss

References 

Japanese racing drivers
Drifting drivers
1976 births
Living people
People from Yamanashi Prefecture
D1 Grand Prix drivers